Picanha is a cut of beef first made popular in Brazil, and later adopted in Portugal.

In the United States, the cut is little known and often named top sirloin cap, rump cover, rump cap, or culotte (French). North American butchers generally divide this cut into other cuts like the rump, the round, and the loin. It consists of the biceps femoris muscle and its fat cap. In recent years the cut has become popular in most of Latin America and has gained a reputation as a tasty meat in the barbecue culture.

In Brazil 

In Brazil, the most prized cut of meat tends to be the picanha. There the traditional preparation is to skewer the meat and cook it over a charcoal grill, with a minimal seasoning consisting of sea salt. The fat is retained until the steak has been cooked. In the United States, however, the fat tends to be removed before preparation, unless requested otherwise by the customer.

Etymology 
The term picanha is of unknown origin. It could be derived from the word picana, which was a pole used by ranchers in the southern parts of Portugal and Spain, particularly in Alentejo, for herding cattle. In Brazil, the word was imported by the gaúcho cowboys of the South region and incorporated into the day-to-day of the countryside. It was common to hear them say among colleagues picanha o bicho! ("prick the animal!"). The location where the animals were pricked is the point where the picanha cut is located, so the name stuck.

See also 
 Churrasco
 List of Brazilian dishes

References 

Cuts of beef
Brazilian cuisine